Munnar Ramesh is an Indian actor who works in Tamil-language films. He is known for his character and villain roles. He has acted in over 100 films. He is known for his frequent collaborations with Vetrimaaran.

Career 
Ramesh worked in a travels company before venturing into cinema. He made his debut with Balu Mahendra's  Adhu Oru Kana Kaalam (2005). His first break came with Pudhupettai (2006) where he played Dhanush's father. He garnered acclaim for the dialogue "Kadavul Irukaan Kumaru" (God is there, Kumar). His dialogue gained popularity and inspired a film of the same name. He played a pivotal role in 6 (2013) as a driver who helps the main character find his son. He played a police officer in Vada Chennai (2018). He also worked as a dubbing artiste for Sayaji Shinde.

Filmography

References

External links 

Living people
Indian male film actors
Male actors in Tamil cinema
Year of birth missing (living people)